Hizla Union is a Union parishad of Chitalmari Upazila, Bagerhat District in Khulna Division of Bangladesh. There are 17 villages and 5 mouzas in the union.

Villeges
 Hizla Kazipara
 Hizla Charpara 
 Hizla Muslimpara
 Hizla Mollapara 
 Hizla Dakkhinpara 
 Charlatima
 Shantikhali
 Shibpur Katakhali
 Kuraltala
 Char Shaildaha
 Betibunia 
 Shantipur 
 Poranpur 
 Pangashia 
 Pirerabad 
 Hasabunia Katakhali
 Boalia

References

Unions of Chitalmari Upazila
Unions of Bagerhat District
Unions of Khulna Division